The men's 1500 metres was an event at the 1996 Summer Olympics in Atlanta, Georgia. There were 57 competitors from 37 nations. The maximum number of athletes per nation had been set at 3 since the 1930 Olympic Congress. The event took place between 29 July and 3 August. The event was won by Noureddine Morceli of Algeria, the nation's first championship in the men's 1500 metres. Fermín Cacho of Spain was unable to repeat as gold medalist, but took silver to become the fourth man to win two medals in the event.

Summary

Algerian Noureddine Morceli had dominated the 1500 for five years, holding the world record and winning the previous three world championships.  But Hicham El Guerrouj, from neighboring Morocco was the rising star, who had chased Morceli in the most recent world championships.   This was expected to be the match race.  While Morceli had led the semi-finals in close to Olympic record time, the final race was much slower and entirely strategic.  Approaching the bell at the end of the third lap, Morceli had moved into the lead with El Guerrouj sprinting up to his shoulder.  Morceli held him off with El Guerrouj having to cede position and move in behind Morceli squeezing in front of defending champion, master tactician Fermin Cacho who was perfectly positioned directly behind Morceli.   Two strides later El Guerrouj tripped and fell.  Morceli took off sprinting at the same moment the rest of the field had to evade El Guerrouj's body on the track.  Cacho was forced to leap over the fallen El Guerrouj, almost stepping on him.  Next in line Abdi Bile had to jump off the track to the infield.  Morceli opened up 2 meters in the process, which he widened to 5 down the backstretch.  Cacho and Bile held that gap onto the final straight. Bile faded while Cacho held on until he could see it was futile to catch Morceli, jogging in for silver.  Stephen Kipkorir led two other Kenyan teammates around Bile to take bronze.  After quickly staggering to his feet, El Guerrouj chased the field but shocked and disheartened, he was unable to catch anybody.

Background

This was the 23rd appearance of the event, which is one of 12 athletics events to have been held at every Summer Olympics. All three medalists (Fermín Cacho of Spain, Rachid El Basir of Morocco, and Mohamed Suleiman of Qatar) from 1992 returned, along with seventh-place finisher Noureddine Morceli of Algeria and ninth-place finisher Graham Hood of Canada. Morceli had been favored in Barcelona, and was again a favorite in Atlanta; he had won the last three world championships and broken the world record twice. Hicham El Guerrouj of Morocco was a rising star expected to challenge Morceli; he had come in second at the 1995 world championships and would go on to win the next four and break the world record himself. Vénuste Niyongabo of Burundi would have been another contender but chose not to enter in order to focus on the 5000 metres.

Burundi, Dominica, the Maldives, the Solomon Islands, and Ukraine each made their first appearance in the event. The United States made its 22nd appearance, most of all nations (having missed only the boycotted 1980 Games).

Competition format

The competition was again three rounds (used previously in 1952 and since 1964). The "fastest loser" system introduced in 1964 was used for both the first round and semifinals. The 12-man semifinals and finals introduced in 1984 and used again in 1992 were used.

There were five heats in the first round, each with 11 or 12 runners. The top four runners in each heat, along with the next four fastest overall, advanced to the semifinals. The 24 semifinalists were divided into two semifinals, each with 12 runners. The top five men in each semifinal, plus the next two fastest overall, advanced to the 12-man final.

Records

These were the standing world and Olympic records prior to the 1996 Summer Olympics.

No new world or Olympic records were set during the competition.

Schedule

All times are Eastern Daylight Time (UTC-4)

Results

Round 1

Heat 1

Heat 2

Heat 3

Heat 4

Heat 5

Overall results for round 1

Semifinals

Semifinal 1

Semifinal 2

Overall results for semifinals

Final

See also
Women's 1500 metres

References

External links
 Official Report
 Results

1
1500 metres at the Olympics
Men's events at the 1996 Summer Olympics